Kofi Awoonor (born George Kofi Nyidevu Awoonor-Williams; 13 March 1935 – 21 September 2013) was a Ghanaian poet and author whose work combined the poetic traditions of his native Ewe people and contemporary and religious symbolism to depict Africa during decolonization. He started writing under the name George Awoonor-Williams, and was also published as Kofi Nyidevu Awoonor. He taught African literature at the University of Ghana. Professor Awoonor was among those who were killed in the September 2013 attack at Westgate shopping mall in Nairobi, Kenya, where he was a participant at the Storymoja Hay Festival.

Biography
George Kofi Nyidevu Awoonor-Williams was born in Wheta, in the Volta region of what was then the Gold Coast, present-day Ghana. He was the eldest of 10 children in the family. He was a paternal descendant of the Awoonor-Williams family of Sierra Leone Creole descent. He was educated at Achimota School and then proceeded to the University of Ghana, graduating in 1960. While at university he wrote his first poetry book, Rediscovery, published in 1964. Like the rest of his work, Rediscovery is rooted in African oral poetry. His early works were inspired by the singing and verse of his native Ewe people, and he later published translations of the work of three Ewe dirge singers (Guardians of the Sacred Word: Ewe Poetry, 1973). Awoonor managed the Ghana Film Corporation and helped to found the Ghana Playhouse, going on to have a significant role in developing theatre and drama in the country. He was also an editor of the literary journal Okyeame and an associate editor of Transition Magazine.

He was also a Ghanaian diplomat, poet, literary critic, and comparative literature professor. Awoonor received a B.A from University College of Ghana.

He studied literature at University College London (M.A., 1970), and while in England wrote several radio plays for the BBC, and began using the name Kofi Awoonor.

He spent the early 1970s in the United States, studying and teaching at Stony Brook University (then called SUNY at Stony Brook) where he obtained his Phd in 1972. While in the United States he wrote This Earth, My Brother and Night of My Blood, both books published in 1971.

Awoonor returned to Ghana in 1975 as head of the English department at the University of Cape Coast. Within months he was arrested for helping a soldier accused of trying to overthrow the military government and was imprisoned without trial; Awoonor was later released when his sentence was remitted in October 1976. The House by the Sea (1978) is about his time in jail. After imprisonment he became politically active. He continued to write mostly non-fiction. 

The early poetry of Awoonor borrows from the Ewe oral tradition, and his grandmother was an Ewe dirge singer. In his critical book Guardians of the Sacred Word and Ewe Poetry, he rendered Ewe poetry in translation (1974). The Breast of the Earth: A Study of the History, Culture, and Literature of Africa South of the Sahara is another work of literary criticism (1975).

Awoonor was Ghana's ambassador to Brazil from 1984 to 1988, before serving as his country's ambassador to Cuba. From 1990 to 1994 Awoonor was Ghana's Permanent Representative to the United Nations, where he headed the committee against apartheid. He was also a former Chairman of the Council of State, the main advisory body to the president of Ghana, serving in that position from 2009 to January 2013.

Death 
On 21 September 2013, Awoonor was among those killed in an attack at the Westgate shopping mall in Nairobi. He was in Kenya as a participant in the Storymoja Hay Festival, a four-day celebration of writing, thinking and storytelling, at which he was due to perform on the evening of his death. His nephew Nii Parkes, who was attending the same literary festival, has written about meeting him for the first time that day. The Ghanaian government confirmed Awoonor's death the next day. His son Afetsi Awoonor, who had accompanied him, was also shot, but was later discharged from hospital.

Awoonor's remains were flown from Nairobi to Accra, Ghana, on 25 September 2013.

His body was cremated and buried at a particular spot in his hometown at Wheta in the Volta Region. Also there was no crying or mourning at his funeral all according to his will before death.

Works
Poetry
Rediscovery and Other Poems (Mbari Publications, 1964)
Night of My Blood (Doubleday, 1971) – poems that explore Awoonor's roots, and the impact of foreign rule in Africa
The House By the Sea (Greenfield Review Press, 1978)
The Promise of Hope: New and Selected Poems (Amalion / University of Nebraska Press, 2014)
Ride Me, Memory (1973)

Novels
This Earth, My Brother (Doubleday, 1971) – a cross between a novel and a poem
Comes the Voyager at Last (Africa World Press, 1992)

Non-fiction
 The Breast of the Earth: A Survey of the History, Culture, and Literature of Africa South of the Sahara (Anchor Press, 1975)
 Ghana: A Political History from Pre-European to Modern Times (Sedco, 1990)
 The African Predicament: Collected Essays (Sub-Saharan Publishers, 2006)
Poems

 The Cathedral
 The Weaver Bird
 Across A New Dawn 
 A Call 
 On the Gallows Once 
 Lament Of The Silent Sister 
 Had Death Not Had Me in Tears
 Songs of Sorrow
 First Circle
 A death Foretold

Understanding and interpreting his works

It is said that Awoonor wrote a great number of his poems as if he was envisioning his own demise.
But he is a peculiar and unique writer, one who strives, almost too hard, to bring his ancestry and culture into his poems, sometimes even borrowing words from the local Ewe dialect.
Being such a strong and avid practitioner of the traditional religion meant that he was of a relict species. Especially for one so highly educated, it was an even rarer phenomenon.
That awareness, not only that he was a relict specimen as an individual, but that the entire culture was suffering entropy, may have come through his poems in a manner that would suggest at first that he was writing about his mortal end.
Besides the personal and cultural lament, Awoonor also shrewdly decried what he would have considered the decadent spectre of Western influences (religions, social organisation and economic philosophy) on the history and fortunes of African people in general. He would lambast the thoughtless exuberance with which Africans themselves embraced such things, and gradually engineered what he would have considered a self-degradation that went far beyond a loss of cultural identity. He would often construct his writings to look at these things through the lens of his own Ewe culture.

Further reading
 Robert Fraser, West African Poetry: A Critical History, Cambridge University Press (1986), 
 Kwame Anthony Appiah and Henry Louis Gates (eds), Africana: The Encyclopedia of the African and African American Experience, Basic Civitas Books (1999),  – p. 153.
 Lauret E. Savoy, Eldridge M. Moores and Judith E. Moores (eds), Bedrock: Writers on the Wonders of Geology, (Trinity University Press, 2006).

References

Kofi Awoonor

External links
 Report on the death of Kofi Awoonor, 22 September 2013. 
 Paula Kahumbu of Princeton University and director of the Story Moja Hay Festival relates her time with Awoonor the Friday evening before his death
 Biographical details, University of KwaZulu-Natal.
 Interview, Sun newspaper (Nigeria), 18 June 2006.
 Poem: Songs of Sorrow by Kofi Awoonor
 Francis Kwarteng, "A Tribute to Prof. Kofi Awoonor", VibeGhana, 23 September 2013.

1935 births
2013 deaths
20th-century Ghanaian poets
20th-century male writers
20th-century novelists
21st-century Ghanaian poets
21st-century male writers
Alumni of Achimota School
Alumni of University College London
Ambassadors of Ghana to Brazil
Ambassadors of Ghana to Cuba
Awoonor-Renner family
Deaths by firearm in Kenya
Ewe people
Ghanaian male poets
Ghanaian murder victims
Ghanaian non-fiction writers
Ghanaian novelists
Ghanaian people murdered abroad
Male non-fiction writers
Members of the Council of State (Ghana)
People murdered in Kenya
Permanent Representatives of Ghana to the United Nations
Poet-diplomats
Academic staff of the University of Cape Coast
University of Ghana alumni
Academic staff of the University of Ghana